Cheryan (also Romanized as Cheryān, Charīān, and Charyān; also known as Chīreyān) is a village in Keraj Rural District, in the Central District of Isfahan County, Isfahan Province, Iran. At the 2006 census, its population was 2,474, in 637 families.

References 

Populated places in Isfahan County